Dullingham is a railway station that serves the village of Dullingham in Cambridgeshire, England. It is also the nearest railway station to the town of Haverhill in Suffolk, which is about 9 miles away. The station, and all trains serving it, are operated by Greater Anglia. Facilities are a ticket machine, a car park, bicycle storage and a small shelter on the platform by the signal box (on the village side).

Dullingham is a remote passing loop on the otherwise single track between Cambridge and Chippenham Junction. There is a signal box and manually operated crossing gates. Although at casual inspection the station looks like a standard double-track station the train operation is somewhat different. The main line passes the platform closer to the village (platform 2); all Westbound services use this platform, but the main-line is signalled bi-directionally and unless trains are required to cross at Dullingham Eastbound services typically use this line too. At the time of writing (December 2012) the only regular passenger service to use the distant platform (platform 1) is the train at around 0800 to Ipswich which passes a train to Cambridge at Dullingham. The remote platform (on the loop line) is only signalled to allow Eastbound services to use it. Fast passing services always use the main line if possible - there is a speed restriction on the loop.

The service pattern typically alternates; trains either call at Dullingham or Kennett Monday-Friday with the exception of the 16:44 and the 17:44 services from Cambridge. Sunday services typically call at both.

Train services
The following services currently call at Dullingham:

References

External links 

Railway stations in Cambridgeshire
DfT Category F2 stations
Former Great Eastern Railway stations
Railway stations in Great Britain opened in 1848
Railway stations in Great Britain closed in 1850
Railway stations in Great Britain opened in 1850
Greater Anglia franchise railway stations